Shenzhen Development Bank Co., Ltd.  was a bank based in Shenzhen, Guangdong, China, listed on the Shenzhen Stock Exchange.

Ping An Insurance bought the controlling stake in Shenzhen Development Bank in 2011, from Newbridge Capital (16.76%) and from the general public, as well as subscribing new share by injecting Ping An Bank into Shenzhen Development Bank as its subsidiary.

In 2012, the bank was reserved merger with Ping An Bank.

References

External links
 

Companies formerly listed on the Shenzhen Stock Exchange
Banks of China
Companies based in Shenzhen
Banks established in 1987
Chinese companies established in 1987
Banks disestablished in 2012
Chinese companies disestablished in 2012